Naberezhne may refer to these villages in the Ukraine.

 Naberezhne, Buchach Raion
 Naberezhne (Crimea)
 Naberezhne, Demydivka Raion
 Naberezhne, Halych Raion
 Naberezhne, Odessa Oblast